Anomaluromorpha is a clade that unites the anomalures, springhares, and zenkerella.  It has alternately been designated as either a suborder or infraorder.  Most recently,  recognized it as one of five suborders of rodents.

Characteristics 
The suborder Anomaluromorpha was erected to unite sciurognathous rodents with a hystricomorphous zygomasseteric system restricted to sub-Saharan Africa.  Many authors have suggested that the two extant families may be only distantly related, and that they belong to separate suborders or infraorders.  For example, the Pedetidae are the only family of rodents with multiserial enamel except for the Hystricognathi.  This characteristic, the hystricomorphous zygomatic region, and a common distribution in southern continents has led many researchers to suggest that the springhares (but not anomalures) may be allied with hystricognaths.   generated some support for Anomaluromorpha in a molecular phylogeny using 12S rRNA and cytochrome b.

Families 
The suborder Anomaluromorpha contains nine living species in four genera and three families.  An additional fossil family probably belongs to this group.
†Parapedetidae
Pedetidae - springhares
Anomaluridae - scaly-tailed flying squirrels, flying mice
Zenkerellidae - zenkerella or Cameroon scaly-tail

Potential relatives 
The following fossil taxa are also sometimes placed in the Anomaluromorpha:
†Diatomys
†Zegdoumyidae

References 

 
 
 

 
Rodent taxonomy
Mammal suborders
Extant Eocene first appearances